Our Lady of Fatima (Spanish: La señora de Fátima) is a 1951 Spanish drama film directed by Rafael Gil and starring Ines Orsini, Fernando Rey and Tito Junco.

Plot 
The story of the 1917 miracle of Fatima, in which the Virgin Mary appeared to three children--two girs and one boy.

Cast
 Ines Orsini as Lucía Abóbora  
 Fernando Rey as Lorenzo Duarte  
 Tito Junco as Oliveira  
 José María Lado as Antonio Abóbora  
 María Dulce as Jacinta  
 Eugenio Domingo as Francisco  
 Antonia Plana as María Rosa 
 Julia Caba Alba as Olimpia  
 Félix Fernández as Marto  
 Rafael Bardem as Padre Manuel  
 Fernando Sancho as Comunista 1  
 Juan Espantaleón as Governor  
 Mario Berriatúa as Manuel  
 Antonio Riquelme as Carballo 
 Milagros Leal 
 Erico Braga 
 Camino Garrigó 
 Julia Delgado Caro 
 Francisco Bernal 
 Adriano Domínguez 
 Ramón Elías 
 Salvador Soler Marí 
 Adela Carboné 
 Matilde Muñoz Sampedro as Andrea 
 Concha López Silva 
 Dolores Bremón 
 María Rosa Salgado as Helena  
 José Nieto as Pilgrim 
 Pepito Maturana as Child  
 José Prada
 Luis Pérez de León
 Ángel Álvarez

References

Bibliography 
 Bentley, Bernard. A Companion to Spanish Cinema. Boydell & Brewer 2008.

External links 
 

1951 drama films
Spanish drama films
1951 films
1950s Spanish-language films
Films directed by Rafael Gil
Films set in Portugal
Films set in 1917
Suevia Films films
Films scored by Ernesto Halffter
Spanish black-and-white films
1950s Spanish films